Godolphin Atlantic (Newquay) Football Club was a football club based in Newquay, Cornwall, England, UK.

History
The club was established as Godolphin Atlantic in 1980 at the Godolphin Arms pub in Newquay. They joined Division Three of the Duchy League and the 1981–82 season saw them win the League Cup and gain promotion to Division Two. They were promoted to Division One at the end of the 1992–93 season and then to the Premier Division in 1996. In 1999–2000 the club won the Knock-Out Cup for a second time. The 2004–05 season saw them win the league's Knock-Out Cup and the Junior Cup, and after finishing as Premier Division runners-up, they were promoted to the East Cornwall League.

Godolphin finished third in their first season in the East Cornwall League, also winning the League Cup. The league split into two at the end of the season, with the club placed in the Premier Division. They won the League Cup again in 2007–08, and after finishing as runners-up in 2007–08, they were promoted to joined Division One West of the South West Peninsula League. They were runners-up in 2010–11 and won the division in 2012–13, earning promotion to the Premier Division, where they joined their local rivals Newquay. In 2014–15 they won the League Cup. Following league reorganisation at the end of the 2018–19 season, the club were placed in the Premier Division West, at which point they were also renamed Godolphin Atlantic (Newquay).

On 3 January 2023 the club announced that they had folded due to financial issues and volunteers.

Honours
South West Peninsula League
Division One West champions 2012–13
League Cup winners 2014–15
East Cornwall League
League Cup winners 2005–06, 2006–07
Duchy League
Knockout Cup winners 1999–2000, 2004–05
League Cup winners 1981–82
Cornwall Junior Cup
Winners 2004–05

See also

Godolphin Atlantic F.C. players

References

External links
Official website

Football clubs in Cornwall
Defunct football clubs in England
Association football clubs established in 1980
1980 establishments in England
Duchy League
East Cornwall League
South West Peninsula League
Association football clubs disestablished in 2023
2023 disestablishments in England